Heliopsis decumbens is a rare South American species of flowering plant in the family Asteraceae. It has been found only in Peru. It, H. canescens, and H. lanceolata are the only three known species of their genus endemic to South America. All the other species are indigenous to North America, with one (H. buphthalmoides) found on both continents.

References

decumbens
Endemic flora of Peru
Plants described in 1940